The kithara, or Latinized cithara, was an ancient Greek musical instrument in the yoke lutes family. It was a seven-stringed professional version of the lyre, which was regarded as a rustic, or folk instrument, appropriate for teaching music to beginners. As opposed to the simpler lyre, the cithara was primarily used by professional musicians, called kitharodes. In modern Greek, the word kithara has come to mean "guitar", a word which etymologically stems from kithara.

Origin and uses
The cithara originated from Minoan-Mycenaean swan-neck lyres developed and used during the Aegean Bronze Age. Scholars such as Martin Litchfield West, Martha Maas, and Jane M. Snyder have made connections between the cithara and stringed instruments from ancient Anatolia.

Whereas the basic lyra was widely used as a teaching instrument in boys’ schools, the cithara was a virtuoso's instrument and generally known as requiring a great deal of skill. The cithara was played primarily to accompany dance, epic recitations, rhapsodies, odes, and lyric songs. It was also played solo at the receptions, banquets, national games, and trials of skill. Aristotle said that these string instruments were not for educational purposes but for pleasure only. It was played by strumming the strings with a stiff plectrum made of dried leather, held in the right hand with elbow outstretched and palm bent inwards. The strings with undesired notes were damped with the straightened fingers of the left hand.

Construction
The cithara had a deep, wooden sounding box composed of two resonating tables, either flat or slightly arched, connected by ribs or sides of equal width. At the top, its strings were knotted around the crossbar or yoke (zugon) or to rings threaded over the bar, or wound around pegs. The other ends of the strings were secured to a tail-piece after passing over a flat bridge, or the tail-piece and bridge were combined.

Most vase paintings show citharas with seven strings, in agreement with ancient authors, but those same authors also mention that occasionally an especially skillful kitharode would use more than the conventional seven strings.

Apollo as a kitharode
The cithara is said to have been the invention of Apollo, the god of music. Apollo is often depicted playing a cithara instead of a lyre, often dressed in a kitharode’s formal robes. Kitharoidos, or Citharoedus, is an epithet given to Apollo, which means "lyre-singer" or "one who sings to the lyre".

An Apollo Citharoedus or Apollo Citharede, is the term for a type of statue or other image of Apollo with a cithara. Among the best-known examples is the Apollo Citharoedus at the Vatican Museums, a 2nd-century CE colossal marble statue by an unknown Roman sculptor.

Sappho as a kitharode
Sappho was closely associated with music, especially string instruments like the cithara and the barbitos. She was a woman of high social standing and composed widely popular songs that focused on the emotions. A story from Greek myth goes that she ascended the steep slopes of Mount Parnassus where she was welcomed by the Muses. She wandered through the laurel grove and came upon the cave of Apollo, where she bathed in the Castalian Spring and took Phoebus' (Apollo's) plectrum to play skillful music. The sacred nymphs danced while she stroked the strings with much talent to bring forth sweet musical melodies from the resonant cithara.

Famous cithara players
Phrynnis of Lesbos: The Suda mentions that Phrynnis was the first to play the cithara at Athens and won at the Panathenaea; by cithara is probably meant the new 12-stringed instrument invented by Melanippides of Melos.

Other instruments called "cithara"
In the Middle Ages, cythara was also used generically for stringed instruments, including lyres, but also including lute-like instruments. The use of the name throughout the Middle Ages looked back to the original Greek cithara, and its abilities to sway people's emotions.

Biblical references
An instrument called the kinnor is mentioned a number of times in the Bible, generally translated into English as "harp" or "psaltery", but historically rendered as "cithara". Psalm 42 in the Latin Vulgate (Psalm 43 in other versions), says, "Confitebor tibi in cithara, Deus, Deus meus," which is translated in the Douay-Rheims version as "To thee, O God my God, I will give praise upon the harp." The King James version renders this verse as "Yea, upon the harp will I praise thee, O God my God." The cithara is also mentioned in other places in the Latin Vulgate version of the Bible, including Genesis 4:21, 1 Kings (1 Samuel) 16:16, 1 Paralipomenon (1 Chronicles) 25:3, Job 30:31, Psalms 32:2, Psalms 56:9, Psalms 70:22, Psalms 80:3, Psalms 91:4, Psalms 97:5, Psalms 107:3, Psalms 146:7, Psalms 150:3, Isaiah 5:12, Isaiah 16:11, 1 Machabees 3:45, and 1 Corinthians 14:7.

The kaithros mentioned in the Book of Daniel may have been the same instrument.

See also

Gallery

References

Citations

Sources

Further reading

External links
Peter Pringle demonstrates how a kithara worked
 A music group directed by scholar Annie Bélis, dedicated to the recreation of ancient Greek and Roman music and playing instruments rebuilt on archaeological reference. In its recording D'Euripide aux premiers chretiens: musique de l'antiquité grecque et romaine, the band plays both Roman and Greek kitharas.

Ancient Greek musical instruments
Ancient Hebrew musical instruments
Lyres
Sacred musical instruments